Greenwood Historic District is part of Maplewood, Missouri, United States, situated at a whistle stop of the Missouri Pacific railroad line.

One building within it is what was once Milligan's Million Article Hardware Store, a thriving turn-of-the-century establishment (built 1905) at 3518 Greenwood Boulevard. The building itself (now "Studio Altius") has been restored by architect Patrick Jugo.

References 

Second Empire architecture in Missouri
Colonial Revival architecture in Missouri
Buildings and structures in St. Louis County, Missouri
Historic districts on the National Register of Historic Places in Missouri
National Register of Historic Places in St. Louis County, Missouri